Doğanlı is a village in the Yüksekova District in Hakkâri Province in Turkey. The village is populated by Kurds of the Alan tribe and had a population of 1,089 in 2022.

History 
The residents of the village were originally from the village of Uzundere in nearby Çukurca District but were relocated to the new settlement of Doğanlı in the mid-1990s during the Kurdish–Turkish conflict. The families were village guards.

Population 
Population history from 2007 to 2022:

References 

Villages in Yüksekova District
Kurdish settlements in Hakkâri Province